Sanvordem Sanvodd'ddem, pronounced ) is a census town in South Goa district in the Indian state of Goa. It is near Shiroda. Sunday is the major market day and people from the nearby areas flock to buy necessities. A few years back it was considered a more remote place in Goa but today it is fast developing town. It is a one-and-a-half-hour drive from the Goan capital Panaji.

Geography
It has an average elevation of 18 metres (59 feet).

Demographics
 India census, Sanvordem had a population of 4832. Males constitute 50% of the population and females 50%. Sanvordem has an average literacy rate of 72%, higher than the national average of 59.5%: male literacy is 78%, and female literacy is 67%. In Sanvordem, 12% of the population is under 6 years of age.

Government and politics
Sanvordem is part of Sanvordem (Goa Assembly constituency) and South Goa (Lok Sabha constituency).

Economy
Mining is one of the major activities of Sanvordem. You would find a lot of trucks carrying the ore from one point to another. It is more known for a wholesale market value.

References

Cities and towns in South Goa district